2014 United States World Cup team may refer to:
United States men's national soccer team in the 2014 FIFA World Cup
2014 United States FIBA Basketball World Cup team